The long reign of the Byzantine Emperor Basil II (976–1025) saw continuous warfare in both East (against the Arabs) and West (against the Bulgarians). A true soldier-emperor, Basil led most of these campaigns himself, something reflected in his epitaph. His complete subjugation of the Bulgarian state earned him the epithet "Bulgar-Slayer" by later generations. Initially, he was to be buried in the last sarcophagus available in the rotunda of Constantine I in the Church of the Holy Apostles in Constantinople. However, Basil later asked his brother and successor Constantine VIII to be buried in the Church of St. John the Theologian (i.e. the Evangelist), at the Hebdomon, a suburb outside the walls of Constantinople which traditionally served as a major army encampment and parade ground. The epitaph on this tomb celebrated Basil's campaigns and victories. The text survives in a number of variants, and its authorship and date are unclear. It is attributed by a 14th-century manuscript to Michael Psellos.

Text and translation

References
Asdracha, Inscr. Byz. (AD 47/48A) 310,102 from Packard Humanities Institute
 
 

Byzantine Greek inscriptions
11th-century inscriptions
Basil II
Constantinople